Husma, is a 2019 Sri Lankan Sinhala drama thriller film directed by Praveen Liyanage and produced by Deshan wikramasinghe for 'Nilkamal' Films. It stars Pubudu Chathuranga, Dasun Pathirana and Isuru Lokuhettiarachchi in lead roles along with Chamathka Lakmini and Anjana Premaratne. Music composed by Keshan Perera. The film is a remake of 2015 Spanish film The Corpse of Anna Fritz.

Plot 
Kumara is a hospital orderly who is surprised to discover that the corpse of actress Tharuka Wijesinghe has been brought to the morgue. When two of his friends arrive at his hospital to spend time with him, he shares this information with them. He also reveals that he plans on raping the corpse. When he does the act, Tharuka revives and the three men must decide whether to help the woman or silence her forever.

Cast
 Dasun Pathirana as Kumara
 Isuru Lokuhettiarachchi as Ruwan
 Pubudu Chathuranga as Namal
 Chamathka Lakmini as Tharuka Wijesinghe
 Anjana Premaratne as mortuary worker
 Mahinda Ihalagama as mortuary 
 Nadee Darshani
 Maheshida De Silva
 Amaya Wijeesuriye
 Ahinsa Ranpathum
 Anuththara Dasanayeka
 Anushka Udayangani
 Kanchana Nandhani
 Nirojith Manorathne
 Sunil Mallikarachchi
 Vishwa Lanka as Vishwa (only voice)

Songs
The film consist with only one song.

References

External links
 Husma on YouTube

2010s Sinhala-language films
2019 films